Juan Ignacio Mercier (born 2 February 1980) is a retired Argentine footballer, who played as a midfielder.

Career

Club career
Mercier started his playing career in the lower leagues of Argentine football in 2000. He played for four clubs in the regionalised 3rd division, eventually helping Platense to win promotion to Primera B Nacional in 2006.

Mercier joined Argentinos Juniors in 2007, making top flight his debut on August 7, 2007 against San Martín de San Juan. He was an important member of the Argentinos Juniors team that won the Clausura 2010 championship. He played in 18 of the club's 19 games during their championship winning campaign. Mercier scored the opening goal in Argentinos' 2-1 win against Huracán in the final game of the season that secured the championship.
On 18 July 2011 he signed a two-year contract with the Saudi club.

On 2 July 2019 San Martín Tucumán announced, that they had signed Mercier.

International career
Mercier made his international debut for the Argentina national team on 26 January 2010 in a 3-2 win in a friendly match against Costa Rica. His second appearance was in a 2-1 win against Jamaica on 10 February 2010.

Honours
Platense
Primera B Metropolitana: 2005-06

Argentinos Juniors
Argentine Primera División: 2010 Clausura

San Lorenzo
Argentine Primera División: 2013 Inicial
Copa Libertadores: 2014

References

External links
 Argentine Primera statistics at Fútbol XXI  
 
 
 

1980 births
Living people
Argentine footballers
Argentine expatriate footballers
Argentina international footballers
Argentine people of French descent
People from Campana, Buenos Aires
Sportspeople from Buenos Aires Province
Association football midfielders
Club Atlético Platense footballers
Argentinos Juniors footballers
Deportivo Morón footballers
San Lorenzo de Almagro footballers
Argentine Primera División players
Al Nassr FC players
Al-Wasl F.C. players
Atlético Tucumán footballers
Club Atlético Mitre footballers
Sacachispas Fútbol Club players
Club Atlético Fénix players
San Martín de Tucumán footballers
Saudi Professional League players
UAE Pro League players
Expatriate footballers in Saudi Arabia
Argentine expatriate sportspeople in Saudi Arabia
Expatriate footballers in the United Arab Emirates
Argentine expatriate sportspeople in the United Arab Emirates